The 2021–22 season was the 98th season in the existence of RC Celta de Vigo and the club's 10th consecutive season in the top flight of Spanish football. In addition to the domestic league, Celta Vigo participated in this season's edition of the Copa del Rey.

Players

First-team squad

Reserve team

Out on loan

Transfers

In

Out

Pre-season and friendlies

Competitions

Overall record

La Liga

League table

Results summary

Results by round

Matches
The league fixtures were announced on 30 June 2021.

Copa del Rey

Statistics

Appearances and goals
Last updated on 21 May 2022.

|-
! colspan=14 style=background:#dcdcdc; text-align:center|Goalkeepers

|-
! colspan=14 style=background:#dcdcdc; text-align:center|Defenders

|-
! colspan=14 style=background:#dcdcdc; text-align:center|Midfielders

|-
! colspan=14 style=background:#dcdcdc; text-align:center|Forwards

|-
! colspan=14 style=background:#dcdcdc; text-align:center| Players who have made an appearance or had a squad number this season but have left the club

|}

Goalscorers

Notes

References

RC Celta de Vigo seasons
Celta Vigo